Adrian Matei (born 25 February 1985 in Bucharest, Romania) is a Romanian figure skater. He is a four-time Romanian national silver medalist.

Competitive highlights

 J = Junior level

External links
 

Sportspeople from Bucharest
Romanian male single skaters
Living people
1985 births